Whittington is an opera (described in the premiere programme as 'A New Grand Opera Bouffe Feerie, in Four Acts and Nine Tableaux) with music by Jacques Offenbach, based on the legend of Dick Whittington and His Cat. It was premiered in a spectacular production at the Alhambra Theatre, London, on 26 December 1874. Whittington is the only major work of Offenbach to have received its premiere in London, and came between the incidental music for La Haine and his third version of Geneviève de Brabant.

Background
The work was commissioned by Wood & Co, publishers for the Christmas season at the Alhambra, Leicester Square. Based on a scenario by H. B. Farnie, a French libretto was prepared by Charles-Louis-Étienne Nuitter and Étienne Tréfeu (who had previously given Offenbach Il signor Fagotto, Le Fifre enchanté, Coscoletto, La princesse de Trébizonde and Boule de neige), and then translated into English by Farnie for the production in London.

Offenbach devised three major dance sequences in deference to the Alhambra's reputation as a theatre of ballet: for sailors in Act 1, a 'Grand Barbaric Ballet' in Act 2 and a ballet for peasants and archers in the fourth act. The 1890s French critic in Les Annales was particularly impressed by several numbers of the score, noting particularly the quartet "Tout bon citoyen d'Angleterre", the cat's song, the duetto "Mais qu'est ce donc qu'une chatte ?" and the Act 1 quartet of the inventory. Yon cites the ballad "Wind that blows across the sea", Hirvoia's brindisi, the police sergeant's comic song and the first act finale with its 'romance du miaou' and waltz song, as evidence of Offenbach keeping to his high musical standards.

Offenbach's La chatte métamorphosée en femme also has a prominent role for a feline.

Performance history
In anticipation of the new piece, the Alhambra revived Offenbach's Le roi Carotte; at its premiere Whittington was preceded by Dieu et la Bayadère by Auber and a one-act farce. Whittington then ran for 120 performances in the large theatre of the Alhambra.

The notice given in The Illustrated Sporting and Dramatic News for the 1874–1875 production criticized both text and music, and faulting it for tampering with the well-known story and transposing the whole cast on the ship to meet the fate of being shipwrecked. More favourable reviews were given elsewhere, for instance in The Athenaeum.

Since 1885 the director of the Théâtre du Châtelet in Paris had wished to mount Whittington in the French capital. Finally on 19 October 1893 the work was seen at the theatre as Le Chat du diable. For this, Nuitter and Tréfeu reworked their original libretto, and a few movements from the ballet Le Papillon were inserted in the score. It ran for 77 performances that year (with another 11 in early 1894) but then fell into neglect.

In more recent times the 2000 City of London Festival included a concert performance of the work at the Mansion House, using materials reconstructed from an autograph score dating from Offenbach's lifetime, possibly for a putative French staging. The cast included Sally Bruce-Payne in the title rôle, Constance Hauman, Nerys Jones, Christian Immler and Kevin West; the conductor was Cem Mansur and narrator John Suchet.

In 2005 University College Opera staged the work at the Bloomsbury Theatre London.

The song 'The Haunted Kickaboo' in Act 1 was published separately after the London premiere and found its way into Victorian song anthologies. No 17 in Act 2, "Voici le moment où l'on dîne" is included in the CD Offenbach anthology 'Offenbach au menu'.

Roles

Synopsis
Dick Whittington is an apprentice to the draper Fitzwarren whose daughter Alice he is in love with. After an argument with his master, Whittington flees the shop in company of his cat Thomas. Alice and the cook Dorothy track him down in Highgate where he is sleeping on the street with his cat as a pillow. Dick goes on the run again pursued across rooftops by a strange police patrol. He embarks on the sailing ship Z. 10 owned by Fitzwarren under the captain Bobstay. In the second act the ship has set in on the exotic island of Bambouli with temples and sacred gardens where Whittington and others witness a grand procession of the local ruler. Employed at the court Dick gains swift promotion thanks to the attentions of Princess Hirvaia, although he remains faithful to Alice. Whittington becomes rich by ridding the island of all its rats with the help of his cat. The third act, after a pastoral interlude, is back in London, where the cat guides Dick to Alice's house. Now a rich man, Whittington can marry Alice. Kind Edward the third receives him at Westminster Hall and names him Lord Mayor of London, and the opera ends with a grand Lord mayoral procession.

Musical numbers
The vocal score published in London by J. B. Cramer & Co, 201, Regent Street W contains both the English words of Farmie and the French words of Nuitter and Tréfeu.

In square brackets are additional words on the inner pages.

References

Operas by Jacques Offenbach
Operas
1874 operas
English-language operettas